Calytrix brevifolia, also known as the short leaved starflower, is a species of plant in the myrtle family Myrtaceae that is endemic to Western Australia.

The flowers have fine hairs which extend from the calyx lobes beyond the petals.

Often found in heath and woodlands on sandplains in coastal areas of the Mid West and Gascoyne regions of Western Australia where it grows in sandy soils.

The species was originally described as Calycothrix brevifolia by the botanist Carl Meisner in 1857 in the Journal of the Proceedings of the Linnean Society, Botany and later reclassified into the genus Calytrix by George Bentham in 1867 in the work Orders XLVIII. Myrtaceae- LXII. Compositae in Flora Australiensis.

References

Plants described in 1867
brevifolia
Flora of Western Australia